"Pretty Baby" is a song by American singer-songwriter Vanessa Carlton from her 2002 debut album, Be Not Nobody. The song was released as the third single from the album in on December 2, 2002, but did not experience prolonged chart success in the United States or abroad.

Awards and accolades
"Pretty Baby" was nominated for "Choice Love Song" at the 2003 Teen Choice Awards but lost to "Crazy in Love" by Beyoncé and Jay-Z.

Track listings

European CD single
 "Pretty Baby"
 "Swindler"

European enhanced CD single
 "Pretty Baby"
 "Swindler"
 "Red Ditty"
 "Pretty Baby" (enhanced video)

UK CD single
 "Pretty Baby"
 "Twilight" (live)
 "A Thousand Miles" (live in New York)
 "Pretty Baby" (director's cut video)

Charts

Release history

References

2001 songs
2002 singles
A&M Records singles
Music videos directed by Marcos Siega
Song recordings produced by Ron Fair
Songs written by Vanessa Carlton
Vanessa Carlton songs